Coleman Hall, also known as the President's House, is a historic home located at Fayette, Howard County, Missouri.  It was built in 1874, and is a two-story, double pile, brick dwelling with a two-story rear ell.  It has a central hall plan in the Late Georgian style and Italianate style design elements. The hipped roof is topped by a cupola. It was built to be donated as a president's house for Central Methodist College.

It was listed on the National Register of Historic Places in 1986.  It is located in the Fayette Residential Historic District.

References

Individually listed contributing properties to historic districts on the National Register in Missouri
Houses on the National Register of Historic Places in Missouri
Houses completed in 1874
Buildings and structures in Howard County, Missouri
National Register of Historic Places in Howard County, Missouri